Sympis ochreobasis is a moth of the family Noctuidae first described by Pagenstecher in 1900. It is endemic to the Bismarck Islands of Papua New Guinea.

References

Catocalinae
Moths of Papua New Guinea